Ivica Jelić (born 10 August 1952) is a Croatian volleyball player and coach. He competed in the men's tournament at the 1980 Summer Olympics. He is the father of Barbara Jelić-Ružić and Vesna Jelić.

References

1952 births
Living people
Croatian men's volleyball players
Olympic volleyball players of Yugoslavia
Volleyball players at the 1980 Summer Olympics
People from Vranje